The wapentake of Corringham stretched for 13 miles along the east bank of the River Trent, varying in width between 5 and 8 miles, and bounded by Manley wapentake, the Isle of Axholme, parts of Nottinghamshire, and Well and Aslacoe wapentakes.

The wapentake straddles a gentle rise in the land, from the marshes or cars along the banks of the river, undulating up to the western ridge of the Lincolnshire Wolds, also known as Cliff Range. Whites notes that in medieval times there were extensive rabbit warrens in the area.

The entire wapentake was wholly in the Deanery of  Corringham, the Archdeanconry of Stow, and  the Parts of Lindsey, and includes the port town of Gainsborough, and the country market town of Kirton in Lindsey.

The parishes in this wapentake were:

Blyton-cum-Wharton
Greenhill and Redhill extra parochial
Corringham
Gainsborough
Morton by Gainsborough
East Stockwith
Walkerith
Grayingham
Heapham
Kirton in Lindsey
Laughton by Blyton
Wildsworth hamlet
Lea
Northorpe
Paddocks extra parochial
Pilham with Gilby
Scotter
Scotton
East Ferry
Scunthorpe extra parochial
Springthorpe

References

External links
GenUKI genealogy web site

Wapentakes of Lindsey